Michael Carter (born 17 June 1949) is a British boxer. He competed in the men's bantamweight event at the 1968 Summer Olympics. He fought as Mickey Carter.

He won the 1967 and 1968 Amateur Boxing Association British bantamweight title, when boxing out of the Repton ABC.

References

External links
 

1949 births
Living people
British male boxers
Olympic boxers of Great Britain
Boxers at the 1968 Summer Olympics
Boxers from Greater London
Bantamweight boxers